The men's 200 metres at the 2017 World Championships in Athletics was held at the London Olympic Stadium on 7, 9, and 10 August.

Summary
Coming out of the blocks in the final, Wayde van Niekerk and Isaac Makwala were the first to make up ground on the stagger, coming off the turn with Ramil Guliyev about even. Makwala started to lose ground, passed by Jereem Richards to his outside. van Niekerk seemed to have the edge until the last 30 metres when Guliyev pulled ahead. As Richards closed, all the athletes leaned for a photo finish. Guliyev had a clear win, but van Niekerk's edge for silver on Richards was the narrowest possible, .001 of a second 20.106 to 20.107.

Records
Before the competition records were as follows:

The following records were set at the competition:

Qualification standard
The standard to qualify automatically for entry was 20.44.

Schedule
The event schedule, in local time (UTC+1), is as follows:

Results

Heats
The first round took place on 7 August in seven heats. However, Isaac Makwala, who was prevented from competing due to being quarantined for norovirus, was allowed to run in an additional heat on the 9 August following an appeal by the Botswana delegation. The 8 heats were as follows:

The first three in each heat ( Q ) and the next four fastest ( q ) qualified for the semifinals. The overall results were as follows:

Semifinals
The semifinals took place on 9 August in three heats as follows:

The first two in each heat ( Q ) and the next two fastest ( q ) qualified for the final. The overall results were as follows:

Final
The final took place on 10 August at 21:52. The wind was −0.1 metres per second and the results were as follows (photo finish):

References

Notes

200
200 metres at the World Athletics Championships